Magia (English: Magic) is the debut studio album by Colombian singer Maluma. It was released on 7 August 2012, by Sony Music Colombia. The album was supported by six singles: "Farandulera", "Loco", "Obsesión", "Magia", "Pasarla Bien" and "Miss Independent".

Track listing

Certifications

References

2012 debut albums
Albums produced by Sky Rompiendo
Maluma albums
Sony Music Colombia albums
Spanish-language albums